was a Japanese poet who wrote haiku.

Biography
Kijo was born in 1865 in Edo, Japan. He studied law but gave this up after losing his hearing due to illness. In 1894, he worked as a legal scribe in Takasaki. He helped publish the first edition of Hototogisu, a haiku magazine. He published his collection of work in 1917. In 1927, his house burned down with everything that he owned. Kijo died on September 17, 1938.

Poems 
First autumn morning
the mirror I stare into
shows my father's face.

The moment two bubbles
are united, they both vanish.
A lotus blooms.

References 

1865 births
1938 deaths
People from Tokyo
20th-century Japanese poets
Japanese haiku poets